Concordia Piotrków Trybunalski is a football club based in Piotrków Trybunalski, Poland. Concordia was established in 1909, and is the sixth oldest Polish football club in existence.

References

External links
Official website 
90minut.pl profile

Association football clubs established in 1909
Piotrków Trybunalski
Football clubs in Łódź Voivodeship
1909 establishments in Poland